Tarrasch may refer to:
Siegbert Tarrasch (1862-1934), Silesian chess master
Tarrasch Defense, a chess opening
Semi-Tarrasch Defense
Tarrasch rule, a principle that applies to chess middlegames and endgames
Tarrasch Trap, either of two opening traps in the Ruy Lopez

Surnames of German origin